An emoticon (rarely), short for "emotion icon", also known simply as an emote, is a pictorial representation of a facial expression using characters—usually punctuation marks, numbers, and letters—to express a person's feelings, mood or reaction, or as a time-saving method.

The first ASCII emoticons are generally credited to computer scientist Scott Fahlman, who proposed what came to be known as "smileys":-) and :-(in a message on the bulletin board system (BBS) of Carnegie Mellon University in 1982.
In Western countries, emoticons are usually written at a right angle to the direction of the text. Users from Japan popularized a kind of emoticon called kaomoji, utilizing the larger character sets required for Japanese, that can be understood without tilting one's head to the left. This style arose on ASCII NET of Japan in 1986.

As SMS mobile text messaging and the Internet became widespread in the late 1990s, emoticons became increasingly popular and were commonly used in texting, Internet forums, and e-mails. Emoticons have played a significant role in communication through technology, and some devices and applications have provided stylized pictures that do not use text punctuation. They offer another range of "tone" and feeling through texting that portrays specific emotions through facial gestures while in the midst of text-based cyber communication. Emoticons were the precursors to modern emojis, which have been in a state of continuous development for a variety of digital platforms. Today, over 90% of the world's online population uses emojis or emoticons.

History

Smiling faces in text & precursors (pre-1981)

In 1648, poet Robert Herrick wrote, "Tumble me down, and I will sit Upon my ruins, (smiling yet:)." Herrick's work predated any other recorded use of brackets as a smiling face by around 200 years. However, experts have since weighed whether the inclusion of the colon in the poem was deliberate and if it was meant to represent a smiling face. English professor Alan Jacobs argued that "punctuation, in general, was unsettled in the seventeenth century ... Herrick was unlikely to have consistent punctuational practices himself, and even if he did he couldn't expect either his printers or his readers to share them."

Precursors to modern emoticons have existed since the 19th century.
The National Telegraphic Review and Operators Guide in April 1857 documented the use of the number 73 in Morse code to express "love and kisses" (later reduced to the more formal "best regards"). Dodge's Manual in 1908 documented the reintroduction of "love and kisses" as the number 88. New Zealand academics Joan Gajadhar and John Green comment that both Morse code abbreviations are more succinct than modern abbreviations such as LOL.

The transcript of one of Abraham Lincoln's speeches in 1862 recorded the audience's reaction as: "(applause and laughter ;)".
There has been some debate whether the glyph in Lincoln's speech was a typo, a legitimate punctuation construct, or the first emoticon.
Linguist Philip Seargeant argues that it was a simple typesetting error.

Before March 1881 the examples of "typographical art" appeared in at least three newspaper articles, including Kurjer warszawski (published in Warsaw) from March 5, 1881, using punctuation to represent the emotions of joy, melancholy, indifference, and astonishment.

In a 1912 essay titled "For Brevity and Clarity", American author Ambrose Bierce suggested facetiously that a bracket could be used to represent a smiling face, proposing "an improvement in punctuation" with which writers could convey cachinnation, loud or immoderate laughter: "it is written thus ‿ and presents a smiling mouth. It is to be appended, with the full stop, to every jocular or ironical sentence".
In a 1936 Harvard Lampoon article, writer Alan Gregg proposed combining brackets with various other punctuation marks to represent various moods.

The September 1962 issue of MAD magazine included an article titled "Typewri-toons". The piece, featuring typewriter-generated artwork credited to "Royal Portable", was entirely made up of repurposed typography, including a capital letter P having a bigger bust than a capital I, a lowercase b and d discussing their pregnancies, an asterisk on top of a letter to indicate the letter had just come inside from snowfall, and a classroom of lowercase n's interrupted by a lowercase h "raising its hand".

A further example attributed to a Baltimore Sunday Sun columnist appeared in a 1967 article in Reader's Digest, using a dash and right bracket to represent a tongue in one's cheek: .
Prefiguring the modern "smiley" emoticon, writer Vladimir Nabokov told an interviewer from The New York Times in 1969, "I often think there should exist a special typographical sign for a smilesome sort of concave mark, a supine round bracket, which I would now like to trace in reply to your question."

In the 1970s, the PLATO IV computer system was launched. It was one of the first computers used throughout educational and professional institutions, but rarely used in a residential setting. On the computer system, a student at the University of Illinois developed pictograms that resembled different smiling faces. Mary Kalantzis and Bill Cope stated this likely took place in 1972, and they claimed these to be the first emoticons. The student's creations likely cover multiple timelines, the creation of computer icons, digital pictograms and emoticons. Since the pictograms were not focused on offering a means to communicate, they aren't generally considered important in the history of the emoticon.

Use of :-) and :-( as communication (1982)
Carnegie Mellon computer scientist Scott Fahlman is generally credited with the invention of the digital text-based emoticon in 1982. 
Carnegie Mellon's bulletin board system (BBS) was a forum used by students and teachers for discussing a variety of topics, where jokes often created misunderstandings. 
As a response to the difficulty of conveying humor or sarcasm in plain text, Fahlman proposed colon–hyphen–right bracket  as a label for "attempted humor".
The use of ASCII symbols, a standard set of codes representing typographical marks, was essential to allow the symbols to be displayed on any computer. 
Fahlman sent the following message after an incident where a humorous warning about a mercury spill in an elevator was misunderstood as serious:

19-Sep-82 11:44    Scott E  Fahlman             :-)
From: Scott E  Fahlman <Fahlman at Cmu-20c>
 
I propose that the following character sequence for joke markers:
        
:-)
        
Read it sideways.  Actually, it is probably more economical to mark
things that are NOT jokes, given current trends.  For this, use
        
:-(

Other suggestions on the forum included an asterisk  and an ampersand , the former meant to represent a person doubled over in laughter, as well as a percent sign  and a pound sign .
Within a few months, the smiley had spread to the ARPANET and Usenet.

Many of those that pre-dated Fahlman either drew faces using alphabetic symbols or created digital pictograms. Scott Fahlman took it a step further, by suggesting that not only could his emoticon communication emotion, but also replace language. Using the emoticons as a form of communication is why Fahlman is seen as the creator of emoticons vs. other earlier claims.

Later evolution
The 1997 book Smileys by David Sanderson included over 650 different emoticons, and James Marshall's online dictionary of emoticons listed over two thousand in the early 2000s.

A researcher at Stanford University surveyed the emoticons used in four million Twitter messages and found that the smiling emoticon without a hyphen "nose"  was much more common than the original version with the hyphen . Linguist Vyvyan Evans argues that this represents a shift in usage by younger users as a form of covert prestige: rejecting a standard usage in order to demonstrate in-group membership.

Inspired by Fahlman's idea of using faces in language, the Loufrani family established The Smiley Company in 1996. Nicolas Loufrani developed hundreds of different emoticons, including 3D versions. His designs were registered at the United States Copyright Office in 1997 and appeared online as .gif files in 1998. These were the first graphical representations of the originally text-based emoticon. He published his icons as well as emoticons created by others, along with their ASCII versions, in an online Smiley Dictionary in the early 2000s. This dictionary included over 3,000 different smileys and was published as a book called Dico Smileys in 2002.

Fahlman has stated that he sees emojis as "the remote descendants of this thing I did." 

On September 23rd, 2021, it was announced that Scott Fahlman was holding an auction for the original emoticons he created in 1982. The auction was held in Dallas, United States and sold the two designs as non-fungible tokens (NFT). The online auction ended later that month, with the originals selling for $237,500.

Styles

Western 
Usually, emoticons in Western style have the eyes on the left, followed by the nose and the mouth. The two-character version :) which omits the nose is also very popular.

The most basic emoticons are relatively consistent in form, but each of them can be transformed by being rotated (making them tiny ambigrams), with or without a hyphen (nose).
There are also some possible variations to emoticons to get new definitions, like changing a character to express a new feeling, or slightly change the mood of the emoticon. For example, :( equals sad and :(( equals very sad. Weeping can be written as :'(. A blush can be expressed as :">. Others include wink ;), a grin :D, smug :->, and  can be used to denote a flirting or joking tone, or may be implying a second meaning in the sentence preceding it. ;P, such as when blowing a raspberry. An often used combination is also <3 for a heart, and <code></3</code> for a broken heart. :O is also sometimes used to depict shock. :/ is used to depict melancholy, disappointment,  or disapproval.  :| is used to depict a neutral face.

A broad grin is sometimes shown with crinkled eyes to express further amusement; XD and the addition of further "D" letters can suggest laughter or extreme amusement e.g. XDDDD. The same is true for X3 but the three represents an animal's mouth. There are other variations including >:( for anger, or >:D for an evil grin, which can be, again, used in reverse, for an unhappy angry face, in the shape of D:<. =K for vampire teeth, :s for grimace, and :P tongue out, can be used to denote a flirting or joking tone, or may be implying a second meaning in the sentence preceding it.

As computers offer increasing built-in support for non-Western writing systems, it has become possible to use other glyphs to build emoticons. The 'shrug' emoticon, ¯\_(ツ)_/¯, uses the glyph ツ from the Japanese katakana writing system.

An equal sign is often used for the eyes in place of the colon, seen as =), without changing the meaning of the emoticon. In these instances, the hyphen is almost always either omitted or, occasionally, replaced with an "o" as in =O). In most circles it has become acceptable to omit the hyphen, whether a colon or an equal sign is used for the eyes, but in some areas of usage people still prefer the larger, more traditional emoticon :-) or :^). One linguistic study has indicated that the use of a nose in an emoticon may be related to the user's age, with younger people less likely to use a nose. Similar-looking characters are commonly substituted for one another: for instance, o, O, and 0 can all be used interchangeably, sometimes for subtly different effect or, in some cases, one type of character may look better in a certain font and therefore be preferred over another. It is also common for the user to replace the rounded brackets used for the mouth with other, similar brackets, such as ] instead of ).

Some variants are also more common in certain countries due to keyboard layouts. For example, the smiley =) may occur in Scandinavia, where the keys for = and ) are placed right beside each other. However, the :) variant is without a doubt the dominant one in Scandinavia, making the =) version a rarity. Diacritical marks are sometimes used. The letters Ö and Ü can be seen as an emoticon, as the upright version of :O (meaning that one is surprised) and :D (meaning that one is very happy) respectively.

Some emoticons may be read right to left instead, and in fact, can only be written using standard ASCII keyboard characters this way round; for example D: which refers to being shocked or anxious, opposite to the large grin of :D.

On the Russian-speaking Internet, the right parenthesis  )  is used as a smiley. Multiple parentheses  ))))  are used to express greater happiness, amusement or laughter. It is commonly placed at the end of a sentence, replacing the full stop. The colon is omitted due to being in a lesser-known position on the ЙЦУКЕН keyboard layout.

Japanese (kaomoji)

Users from Japan popularized a style of emoticons (顔文字, kaomoji, lit. 'face characters') that can be understood without tilting one's head. This style arose on ASCII NET, an early Japanese online service, in the 1980s. They often include Japanese typography in addition to ASCII characters, and in contrast to Western-style emoticons, tend to emphasize the eyes, rather than the mouth.

Wakabayashi Yasushi is credited with inventing the original kaomoji  in 1986.
Similar-looking emoticons were used on the Byte Information Exchange (BIX) around the same time.
Whereas Western emoticons were first used by US computer scientists, kaomoji were most commonly used by young girls and fans of Japanese comics (manga). Linguist Ilaria Moschini suggests this is partly due to the kawaii ('cuteness') aesthetic of kaomoji.
These emoticons are usually found in a format similar to (*_*). The asterisks indicate the eyes; the central character, commonly an underscore, the mouth; and the parentheses, the outline of the face.

Different emotions can be expressed by changing the character representing the eyes: for example, "T" can be used to express crying or sadness: (T_T). T_T may also be used to mean "unimpressed".  The emphasis on the eyes in this style is reflected in the common usage of emoticons that use only the eyes, e.g. ^^.  Looks of stress are represented by the likes of (x_x), while (-_-;) is a generic emoticon for nervousness, the semicolon representing an anxiety-induced sweat drop (discussed further below).  /// can indicate embarrassment by symbolizing blushing, resembling the lines drawn on cheeks in manga. Characters like hyphens or periods can replace the underscore; the period is often used for a smaller, "cuter" mouth, or to represent a nose, e.g. (^.^). Alternatively, the mouth/nose can be left out entirely, e.g. (^^).

Parentheses are sometimes replaced with braces or square brackets, e.g. {^_^} or [o_0]. Many times, the parentheses are left out completely, e.g. ^^, >.< , o_O, O.O, e_e, or e.e. A quotation mark ", apostrophe ', or semicolon ; can be added to the emoticon to imply apprehension or embarrassment, in the same way that a sweat drop is used in manga and anime.

Microsoft IME 2000 (Japanese) or later supports the input of emoticons like the above by enabling the Microsoft IME Spoken Language/Emotion Dictionary.  In IME 2007, this support was moved to the Emoticons dictionary.  Such dictionaries allow users to call up emoticons by typing words that represent them.

Modern communication software generally utilizes Unicode, which allows for the incorporation of characters from other languages and a variety of symbols into the kaomoji, as in (◕‿◕✿) (❤ω❤) (づ ◕‿◕ )づ (▰˘◡˘▰).

Further variations can be produced using Unicode combining characters, as in ٩(͡๏̯͡๏)۶ or ᶘᵒᴥᵒᶅ.

Combination of Japanese and Western styles 
English-language anime forums adopted those Japanese-style emoticons that could be used with the standard ASCII characters available on Western keyboards. Because of this, they are often called "anime style" emoticons in English. They have since seen use in more mainstream venues, including online gaming, instant-messaging, and non-anime-related discussion forums. Emoticons such as <( ^.^ )>, <(^_^<), <(o_o<), <( -'.'- )>, <('.'-^), or (>';..;')> which include the parentheses, mouth or nose, and arms (especially those represented by the inequality signs < or >) also are often referred to as "" in reference to their likeness to Nintendo's video game character Kirby. The parentheses are sometimes dropped when used in the English language context, and the underscore of the mouth may be extended as an intensifier for the emoticon in question, e.g. ^_^ for very happy. The emoticon  uses the Eastern style, but incorporates a depiction of the Western "middle-finger flick-off" using a "t" as the arm, hand, and finger. Another apparently Western invention is the use of emoticons like *,..,* or `;..;´ to indicate vampires or other mythical beasts with fangs.

Exposure to both Western and Japanese style emoticons or kaomoji through blogs, instant messaging, and forums featuring a blend of Western and Japanese pop culture has given rise to many emoticons that have an upright viewing format.  The parentheses are often dropped, and these emoticons typically only use alphanumeric characters and the most commonly used English punctuation marks. Emoticons such as -O-, -3-, -w-, '_', ;_;, T_T, :>, and .V. are used to convey mixed emotions that are more difficult to convey with traditional emoticons. Characters are sometimes added to emoticons to convey an anime- or manga-styled sweat drop, for example ^_^', !>_<!, <@>_<@>;;, ;O;, and *u*.  The equals sign can also be used for closed, anime-looking eyes, for example =0=, =3=, =w=, =A=, and =7=. The uwu face (and its variations UwU and OwO),  is an emoticon of Japanese origin which denotes a cute expression or emotion felt by the user, but has more recently become associated with the furry fandom.

In Brazil, sometimes combining characters (accents) are added to emoticons to represent eyebrows, as in ò_ó, ó_ò, õ_o, ù_u, o_Ô, or ( •̀ ᴗ •́ ).

2channel 

Users of the Japanese discussion board 2channel, in particular, have developed a wide variety of unique emoticons using characters from various scripts, such as Kannada, as in  ಠ_ಠ (for a look of disapproval, disbelief, or confusion).  These were quickly picked up by 4chan and spread to other Western sites soon after.  Some have taken on a life of their own and become characters in their own right, like Monā.

Korean 
In South Korea, emoticons use Korean Hangul letters, and the Western style is rarely used. The structures of Korean and Japanese emoticons are somewhat similar, but they have some differences. Korean style contains Korean jamo (letters) instead of other characters. There are countless number of emoticons that can be formed with such combinations of Korean jamo letters. Consonant jamos ㅅ, ㅁ or ㅂ as the mouth/nose component and ㅇ, ㅎ or ㅍ for the eyes. For example: ㅇㅅㅇ, ㅇㅂㅇ, ㅇㅁㅇ and -ㅅ-. Faces such as 'ㅅ', "ㅅ", 'ㅂ' and 'ㅇ', using quotation marks " and apostrophes ' are also commonly used combinations. Vowel jamos such as ㅜ,ㅠ depict a crying face. Example: ㅜㅜ, ㅠㅠ and 뉴뉴 (same function as T in western style). Sometimes ㅡ (not an em-dash "—" but a vowel jamo), a comma or an underscore is added, and the two character sets can be mixed together, as in ㅜ.ㅜ, ㅠ.ㅜ, ㅠ.ㅡ, ㅜ_ㅠ, ㅡ^ㅜ and ㅜㅇㅡ. Also, semicolons and carets are commonly used in Korean emoticons; semicolons mean sweating (embarrassed). If they are used with ㅡ or – they depict a bad feeling. Examples: -;/, --^, ㅡㅡ;;;, -_-;; and -_^. However, ^^, ^오^ means smile (almost all people use this without distinction of sex or age). Others include: ~_~, --a, -6-, +0+.

Chinese ideographic 

The character 囧 (U+56E7), which means "bright", may be combined with posture emoticon Orz, such as 囧rz. The character existed in Oracle bone script, but its use as emoticon was documented as early as January 20, 2005.

Other ideographic variants for 囧 include 崮 (king 囧), 莔 (queen 囧), 商 (囧 with hat), 囧興 (turtle), 卣 (Bomberman).

The character 槑 (U+69D1), which sounds like the word for "plum" (梅 (U+FA44)), is used to represent double of 呆 (dull), or further magnitude of dullness. In Chinese, normally full characters (as opposed to the stylistic use of 槑) might be duplicated to express emphasis.

Posture emoticons

Orz 

Orz is an emoticon representing a kneeling or bowing person (the Japanese version of which is called dogeza) with the "o" being the head, the "r" being the arms and part of the body, and the "z" being part of the body and the legs. This stick figure can represent respect or kowtowing, but commonly appears along a range of responses, including "frustration, despair, sarcasm, or grudging respect".

It was first used in late 2002 at the forum on Techside, a Japanese personal website. At the "Techside FAQ Forum" (TECHSIDE教えて君BBS(教えてBBS) ), a poster asked about a cable cover, typing  to show a cable and its cover. Others commented that it looked like a kneeling person, and the symbol became popular. These comments were soon deleted as they were considered off-topic. By 2005, Orz spawned a subculture: blogs have been devoted to the emoticon, and URL shortening services have been named after it. In Taiwan, Orz is associated with the phrase "nice guy"that is, the concept of males being rejected for a date by females, with a phrase like "You are a nice guy."

Orz should not be confused with m(_ _)m, which represents a standing bow directly towards the viewer as a means to say "Thank you" or as an apology.

Multimedia variations 
A portmanteau of emotion and sound, an emotisound is a brief sound transmitted and played back during the viewing of a message, typically an IM message or e-mail message. The sound is intended to communicate an emotional subtext. Many instant messaging clients automatically trigger sound effects in response to specific emoticons.

Some services, such as MuzIcons, combine emoticons and music player in an Adobe Flash-based widget.

In 2004, the Trillian chat application introduced a feature called "emotiblips", which allows Trillian users to stream files to their instant message recipients "as the voice and video equivalent of an emoticon".

In 2007, MTV and Paramount Home Entertainment promoted the "emoticlip" as a form of viral marketing for the second season of the show The Hills. The emoticlips were twelve short snippets of dialogue from the show, uploaded to YouTube, which the advertisers hoped would be distributed between web users as a way of expressing feelings in a similar manner to emoticons. The emoticlip concept is credited to the Bradley & Montgomery advertising firm, which hopes they would be widely adopted as "greeting cards that just happen to be selling something".

In 2008, an emotion-sequence animation tool, called FunIcons was created. The Adobe Flash and Java-based application allows users to create a short animation. Users can then email or save their own animations to use them on similar social utility applications.

During the first half of the 2010s, there have been different forms of small audiovisual pieces to be sent through instant messaging systems to express one's emotion. These videos lack an established name, and there are several ways to designate them: "emoticlips" (named above), "emotivideos" or more recently "emoticon videos". These are tiny videos that can be easily transferred from one mobile phone to another. Current video compression codecs such as H.264 allow these pieces of video to be light in terms of file size and very portable. The popular computer and mobile app Skype use these in a separate keyboard or by typing the code of the "emoticon videos" between parentheses.

Emoticons and intellectual property rights 

In 2000, Despair, Inc. obtained a U.S. trademark registration for the "frowny" emoticon :-( when used on "greeting cards, posters and art prints". In 2001, they issued a satirical press release, announcing that they would sue Internet users who typed the frowny; the joke backfired and the company received a storm of protest when its mock release was posted on technology news website Slashdot.

A number of patent applications have been filed on inventions that assist in communicating with emoticons. A few of these have been issued as US patents. US 6987991, for example, discloses a method developed in 2001 to send emoticons over a cell phone using a drop-down menu. The stated advantage over the prior art was that the user saved on the number of keystrokes though this may not address the obviousness criteria.

The emoticon :-) was also filed in 2006 and registered in 2008 as a European Community Trademark (CTM). In Finland, the Supreme Administrative Court ruled in 2012 that the emoticon cannot be trademarked, thus repealing a 2006 administrative decision trademarking the emoticons :-), =), =(:) and :(.

A license would not "cost that muchtens of thousands of dollars" for companies, but would be free of charge for individuals.

Unicode 

A different, but related, use of the term "emoticon" is found in the Unicode Standard, referring to a subset of emoji which display facial expressions. The standard explains this usage with reference to existing systems, which provided functionality for substituting certain textual emoticons with images or emoji of the expressions in question.

Some smiley faces were present in Unicode since 1.1, including a white frowning face, a white smiling face, and a black smiling face. ("Black" refers to a glyph which is filled, "white" refers to a glyph which is unfilled).

The Emoticons block was introduced in Unicode Standard version 6.0 (published in October 2010) and extended by 7.0. It covers Unicode range from U+1F600 to U+1F64F fully.

After that block had been filled, Unicode 8.0 (2015), 9.0 (2016) and 10.0 (2017) added additional emoticons in the range from U+1F910 to U+1F9FF. Currently, U+1F90CU+1F90F, U+1F93F, U+1F94DU+1F94F, U+1F96CU+1F97F, U+1F998U+1F9CF (excluding U+1F9C0 which contains the 🧀 emoji) and U+1F9E7U+1F9FF do not contain any emoticons since Unicode 10.0.

For historic and compatibility reasons, some other heads, and figures, which mostly represent different aspects like genders, activities, and professions instead of emotions, are also found in Miscellaneous Symbols and Pictographs (especially U+1F466U+1F487) and Transport and Map Symbols. Body parts, mostly hands, are also encoded in the Dingbat and Miscellaneous Symbols blocks.

See also 

 ASCII art
 Emotion Markup Language (EML)
 Emotions in virtual communication
 Henohenomoheji
 Hieroglyph
 iConji
 Internet slang
 Irony punctuation
 Kaoani
 List of emoticons
 Martian language
 Pixel art
 Smiley
 Tête à Toto
 Text
 Typographic alignment
 Typographic approximation

Explanatory notes

References

Further reading
 
 Bódi, Zoltán, and Veszelszki, Ágnes (2006). Emotikonok. Érzelemkifejezés az internetes kommunikációban (Emoticons: Expressing Emotions in the Internet Communication). Budapest: Magyar Szemiotikai Társaság.
 Dresner, Eli, and Herring, Susan C. (2010). "Functions of the Non-verbal in CMC: Emoticons and Illocutionary Force" (preprint copy). Communication Theory 20: 249–268.
 
 Veszelszki, Ágnes (2012). Connections of Image and Text in Digital and Handwritten Documents. In: Benedek, András, and Nyíri, Kristóf (eds.): The Iconic Turn in Education. Series Visual Learning Vol. 2. Frankfurt am Main et al.: Peter Lang, pp. 97−110.
 Veszelszki, Ágnes (2015). "Emoticons vs. Reaction-Gifs: Non-Verbal Communication on the Internet from the Aspects of Visuality, Verbality and Time". In: Benedek, András − Nyíri, Kristóf (eds.): Beyond Words: Pictures, Parables, Paradoxes (series Visual Learning, vol. 5). Frankfurt: Peter Lang. 131−145.
 Wolf, Alecia (2000). "Emotional expression online: Gender differences in emoticon use". CyberPsychology & Behavior 3: 827–833.

External links 
 

 
ASCII art
Computer-related introductions in 1982
Email
Internet forum terminology
Internet memes
Internet slang
Online chat
Pictograms